Paul Manning (born 25 September 1990) is a Caymanian cricketer. In August 2019, he was named in the Cayman Islands cricket team's Twenty20 International (T20I) squad for the Regional Finals of the 2018–19 ICC T20 World Cup Americas Qualifier tournament. He made his T20I debut for the Cayman Islands against Canada on 18 August 2019.

References

External links
 

1990 births
Living people
Caymanian cricketers
Cayman Islands Twenty20 International cricketers
Place of birth missing (living people)